The 2013 Ondrej Nepela Trophy was the 21st edition of an annual senior international figure skating competition held in Bratislava, Slovakia. It took place on October 3–5, 2013 at the Ondrej Nepela Ice Rink. Medals were awarded in the disciplines of men's singles, ladies' singles, pairs, and ice dancing.

Entries

Results

Men

Ladies

Pairs

Ice dancing

References

External links
 2013 Ondrej Nepela Trophy results
 21st Ondrej Nepela Trophy

Ondrej Nepela Memorial
Ondrej Nepela Trophy, 2013
Ondrej Nepela Trophy